Hepatolithiasis is the presence of gallstones in the biliary ducts of the liver. Treatment is usually surgical. It is rare in Western countries, but prevalent in East Asia.

The gallstones are normally found proximal to the left and right hepatic ducts. The causes of the disease are poorly understood, but it is suspected that genetics, diets and environmental causes may contribute. It is more common in those of low socioeconomic status who suffer from malnutrition. Typically it strikes between 50 and 70 years old, with neither men nor women more likely to acquire it.

The prevalence in east Asia ranges is as high as 30-50%, while in the west it is rare. However, immigration has increased its prevalence in the West. Countries that have seen more economic development have also seen a reduction in the rates of the disease.

Some patients have these gallstones with no symptoms and the disease is only detected through abdominal imaging. For those with symptoms, common ones are abdominal pain, jaundice and fever. The gallstones can cause more serious conditions like fibrinolysis disorder or gallstone pancreatitis.

References

External links

Diseases of liver